Larry Tukis (born October 6, 1964) is a retired American soccer goalkeeper who played professionally in the Major Indoor Soccer League and National Professional Soccer League.

Tukis attended Cabrini College where he played on the men's soccer team from 1982 through 1985.  He played one game for the Kansas City Comets during the 1987-1988 Major Indoor Soccer League.  He then spent two seasons with the Hershey Impact of the American Indoor Soccer Association.  On November 18, 1990, the Impact released Tukis to free up a roster spot for newly signed Scoop Stanisic.Tukis also played one season (1991–1992) with the Harrisburg Heat of the National Professional Soccer League.

References

External links
 MISL stats

Living people
1954 births
American soccer players
American Indoor Soccer Association players
Harrisburg Heat players
Hershey Impact players
Kansas City Comets (original MISL) players
Major Indoor Soccer League (1978–1992) players
National Professional Soccer League (1984–2001) players
People from Fair Haven, New Jersey
Association football goalkeepers